Tannadice railway station served the village of Tannadice, Angus, Scotland, from 1895 to 1952 on the Forfar and Brechin Railway.

History 
The station was opened on 1 June 1895 by the Caledonian Railway. On the platform was the station building and opposite of it was a pair of sidings. Despite its name, the station was situated 1.5 miles away from the village, instead being situated closer to Tannadyce House. The remote location meant that patronage was low, so it closed on 4 August 1952.

References 

Disused railway stations in Angus, Scotland
Former Caledonian Railway stations
Railway stations in Great Britain opened in 1895
Railway stations in Great Britain closed in 1952
1895 establishments in Scotland
1952 disestablishments in Scotland